Brianna Wu (born July 6, 1977) is an American video game developer and computer programmer. She co-founded Giant Spacekat, an independent video game development studio, with Amanda Warner in Boston, Massachusetts. She is also a blogger and podcaster on matters relating to the video game industry.

In 2018, Wu unsuccessfully ran for Congress in Massachusetts's 8th congressional district. Wu began a second campaign for the primary in 2020; in April, she announced her departure from the race, due to the COVID-19 lockdown preventing in-person campaigning.

Career
Wu was born in West Virginia and raised in Mississippi by adoptive parents. She grew up in an entrepreneurial environment; her father was a retired US Navy doctor who opened his own clinic, and her mother ran a series of small businesses. In 2003 she enrolled at the University of Mississippi, studying journalism and political science. At the age of 19, she formed a small animation studio to create an animated pilot episode. The venture was unsuccessful, resulting in her withdrawal from college and a move to Washington, D.C. to work in political fundraising for several years. She later worked as a journalist until she was inspired by the release of the iPhone to work as a graphical designer and create a video game.

In 2008, she married Frank Wu, four-time winner of the Hugo Award for Best Fan Artist. In 2010, she co-founded the company Giant Spacekat with Amanda Stenquist Warner. Wu was co-host of the weekly Isometric podcast on Relay FM. The podcast was launched in May 2014 and covers the video game industry. On April 18, 2016, the Isometric podcast was ended. The same hosts, including Wu, started a new podcast called Disruption on Relay FM, covering technology and culture. In 2020, she co-founded Rebellion PAC, a political action committee with a focus on running advertisements in support of progressive electoral candidates, alongside Cenk Uygur.

Revolution 60

Wu is credited as head of development for her company Giant Spacekat's game, Revolution 60. It features female protagonists, said to echo the founders of the game studio. The game was demonstrated at Pax East in March 2013, where it was listed as one of the 10 best indie games of the conference. The game, created with the Unreal Engine for a total budget of several hundred thousand dollars, was released for iOS devices in July 2014.  In July 2013 Giant Spacekat ran a Kickstarter campaign to fund a Windows release of the game in addition to the iOS version. The fundraiser brought in $12,728, over 250% of the original $5,000 goal. Although the estimated delivery was August 2014, the Windows version was not released until September 2016.

2018 congressional bid
Wu decided immediately after the 2016 American presidential election to run for a Congressional seat in the greater Boston area, focusing in part on privacy rights and online harassment, but also on the wider Massachusetts economy. She challenged Rep. Stephen F. Lynch of the 8th district, in an announcement she made on Twitter. Wu stated, in a radio interview, that Lynch did not sufficiently represent the Democrats, citing his positions on reproductive health care and LGBT rights; Lynch is a centrist on the former and supportive of the latter. Wu also came out in favor of unions and collective bargaining. Wu feels that Massachusetts proportionally contributes more to the federal government than it receives in return and wants to use it as leverage in negotiations.  She hopes that the Boston Bay area can rival San Francisco Bay as a technology hub. Wu moved to the 8th District in order to challenge the incumbent Lynch.

Wu also cited opposition to then-President Donald Trump, what she perceived as failures by Congress on technology issues, and what she perceived as the failure of the Democratic Party to emotionally connect with its voters as reasons for shifting from game development to politics.

Professor Thomas Whalen of Boston University commented that the South Boston 8th district is traditionally conservative and Lynch is native to the area and has strong ties to labor unions, but thought recent years of changing dynamics could help Wu. Meanwhile, David S. Bernstein, a long-time political reporter for Boston Magazine, did not think Wu has a chance of unseating Lynch.

On Twitter in February 2017, Wu received media attention after she posted warnings about the militarization of space, along with voicing her concerns over giving private space tourism companies sole access to the Moon. She wrote, "Rocks dropped from (the Moon) have power of 100s of nuclear bombs". She later deleted the tweets after receiving criticism.

In late October 2017, Wu used the streaming service Twitch to raise awareness for her Congressional campaign. This appears to be the first instance of anyone using Twitch in this manner. "One of the reasons Millennials feel disenfranchised is politicians don’t speak to them in ways that feel genuine," said Wu. "Twitch is one of the most important ways to engage younger people." When asked, neither Twitch, the DNC nor the Pew Research Center were aware of anyone having had done such previously. Wu was playing Wolfenstein II: The New Colossus during the stream.

Wu lost to Lynch in the Democratic primary held on September 4, 2018, having received approximately 23% of the vote to Lynch's 71%.

2020 congressional bid
Wu began a second campaign for the 2020 election, again with an emphasis on tech issues such as Elizabeth Warren's proposal to break up giant new media companies such as Apple, Facebook and Google. She noted on a WGBH-TV panel that "For whatever reason, our Department of Justice has been more reluctant to pursue antitrust cases against companies in the last few years, certainly since the Bush years." She differs from certain elements of Warren's proposal, citing privacy concerns.

She endorses the Green New Deal, legislative goals aimed at shifting the United States to 100 percent renewable energy by 2035. The title of her retrospective piece for Marie Claire in October 2018 sums up her political philosophy: "I Ran for Congress. I Lost. I'm Persisting. Quitting Is Not an Option in the Trump Era." On July 22, 2019, she was interviewed  by the Crooks and Liars contributor Howie Klein.

In April 2020, due to the impact of the COVID-19 pandemic on her campaign, she suspended her congressional bid.

Gamergate-related harassment

In October 2014, Wu posted multiple tweets about Gamergate advocates, ridiculing them for "fighting an apocalyptic future where women are 8 percent of programmers and not 3 percent." While she was monitoring 8chan's pro-Gamergate chanboard (/gg/), anonymous users posted sensitive personal information about her, including at least one post containing her address. Subsequently, Wu began receiving multiple, specific rape and death threats including her address, causing Wu to flee her home. These threats have been widely attributed to Gamergate supporters. In December, Wu said that she had received emails that contained images of mutilated dogs from people who identified as Gamergate supporters, following the recent death of her dog.

Along with Anita Sarkeesian and Zoë Quinn, Wu was one of the targets of Gamergate harassment. In February 2015, she said, "by attacking me so viciously, they're helping give me the visibility to usher in the very game industry they're terrified about." Wu started a legal defense fund for women targeted by Gamergate. As of late 2014, the Wu family was also offering a cash reward for information leading to the prosecution of those who sent the death threats.  By February 2015 she said she was spending a full day a week contacting law enforcement, and was only attending events in the US with a security detail. In March 2015, she said she had received 48 death threats during the previous six months. As of May 2019, she and her husband were still living under aliases.

In early 2017, the Federal Bureau of Investigation (FBI) closed its investigation of the matter. The FBI identified four men who sent threats and obtained confessions from two of them, one of whom stated that they had sent the threat as a "joke" but "understood that it was a federal crime to send a threatening communication to anyone and will never do it again". The U.S. Attorney for the District of Massachusetts declined to prosecute, giving no specific reason.  Reacting to the report, Wu stated the FBI did not care about the investigation and that she was "livid". In the wake of the 2019 Poway synagogue shooting, however, she said that the FBI needs dedicated agents who understand online culture (8chan in particular).

In August 2021, The Washington Post noted that "despite the attempts to discredit her, wreck her career and destroy her sense of safety, Wu has now become a vocal proponent of forgiveness for those who apologize and show they have grown." However, "insults and continued harassment" still outnumbered apologies "10-to-1".

As a result of the harassment, Wu said that she was diagnosed with post-traumatic stress disorder (PTSD).

References

External links

 
 Current official campaign website 
 "Video games don’t cause mass shootings. But gamer culture encourages hate." (August 9, 2019) The Washington Post (op-ed by Brianna Wu on toxic gamer culture)
 

1977 births
21st-century American women politicians
Activists from Massachusetts
American adoptees
American feminists
American social justice activists
American software engineers
American video game designers
Candidates in the 2018 United States elections
Candidates in the 2020 United States elections
Indie video game developers
People from Boston
Politicians from Dedham, Massachusetts
Living people
Victims of cyberbullying
Video game development companies
Women in Massachusetts politics
Women video game developers
21st-century American politicians